You Must Believe in Spring may refer to:

 "You Must Believe in Spring", a popular song written by Michel Legrand and Jacques Demy for the 1967 French film The Young Girls of Rochefort
You Must Believe in Spring (Bill Evans album), recorded in 1977 and released in 1980
You Must Believe in Spring (Frank Morgan album), 1992